Bertram Stuart Straus (17 March 1867 – 26 August 1933) was a British businessman and Liberal Party politician.

Background
Born in Manchester, he was the son of Henry S Straus of Sedgley Park, a merchant and vice consul for the Netherlands. Following education at Harrow School he was articled to Hale & Sons, colonial brokers in the City of London. The company specialised in the importation of ostrich feathers, ivory, rubber, mother of pearl, drugs, gums, spices, cocoa, mica, isinglass, fibres and carpets. He subsequently became a partner in the business, from which he retired in 1898. He was later chairman of Virol Limited, manufacturers of "Virol", a malt extract based vitamin preparation.

Politics
Straus entered politics as a member of Marylebone Vestry, and was later elected as a Progressive Party Councillor to represent Mile End on the London County Council in 1898, and was re-elected in 1901 and 1904.

At the 1895 general election Straus was chosen as the Liberal candidate to contest the constituency of Marylebone West, but failed to be elected. At the next general election in 1900 he stood at Tower Hamlets, St George, narrowly failing to be elected. 

When the 1905 Mile End by-election was held at Mile End in 1905, Straus came close to winning the seat, losing to the Liberal Unionist candidate Harry Levy-Leveson by 78 votes. 

When a general election was held in the following year, Straus again faced Levy-Lawson at Mile End and managed to unseat him to become member of parliament. 

Straus was only to hold the seat for a single term, with Levy-Leveson regaining it at the next election in January 1910 by 57 votes. 

When a further election was held in December 1910, Straus and Levy-Lawson again faced each other, with Levy-Lawson holding the seat by only 6 votes.

He did not stand for parliament again.

Straus never married and died at his home at Hyde Park Mansions in August 1933, aged 66. He was cremated at Golders Green Crematorium.

References

External links 

1867 births
1933 deaths
Liberal Party (UK) MPs for English constituencies
UK MPs 1906–1910
English Jews
Members of London County Council
People educated at Harrow School
Progressive Party (London) politicians
Businesspeople from Manchester
Politicians from Manchester
Jewish British politicians